Planktotalea arctica is a Gram-negative, rod-shaped and non-motile  bacterium from the genus of Planktotalea which has been isolated from coastal seawater from the Arctic.

References

External links
Type strain of Planktotalea arctica at BacDive -  the Bacterial Diversity Metadatabase

Rhodobacteraceae
Bacteria described in 2017